Tronson is a surname. Notable people with the surname include:

Mark Tronson (born 1951), Australian Baptist pastor
Robert Tronson (1924–2008), English film and television director

See also
Philippe Charles Tronson du Coudray (1738–1777), French Army officer